Angels Fall First is a first-person multiplayer shooter by British studio Strangely Interactive, combining game-play elements of traditional squad-based shooters with space combat games, with a particular focus on the ability to pilot and crew capital ships, which also serve as infantry combat settings themselves. Previously a mod of Epic Games' first-person shooter Unreal Tournament 3 and referred to as Angels Fall First: Planetstorm, the game has since been moved to the Unreal Development Kit and was released on Steam's Early Access on 10 October 2015 with its current title.

Plot and Setting
Angels Fall First is set in a science fiction universe during the period known as the Second Antarean War, an outbreak of hostilities between the previously subdued and forcefully integrated Antarean Empire and an alliance of several stellar states known as the United League of Planets.

The war itself was caused by a variety of factors. The gradual decay of the League (which was itself only created out of necessity during the First Antarean War), the upsurge of nationalism among the Antareans, and the reestablishment of old alliances by the rebel Antarean factions. But it was primarily caused by the event known as the Crowning Day Massacre, in which a naval blunder by the United League of Planets caused the deaths of thousands of civilians during an Antarean holiday, including that of a well-loved public Antarean figure. In the resulting chaos, the long lost heir to the Antarean throne reappeared, solidifying the Antarean revolt as well as throwing the regions into a full-scale war.

Gameplay
Angels Fall First combines two types of gameplay: FPS and space shooters. Several of its maps take place on planet surfaces, primarily focused on combined arms warfare, featuring Fast-Attack vehicles, Armoured Personnel Carriers, Tanks and atmospheric Gunships. Others take place in space with a variety of spacecraft ranging from small fighters to large capital ships, all of which can be piloted and crewed by players. Infantry combat also takes place in space maps, with several maps featuring objectives that require boarding by dropship. Furthermore, players are able to board enemy capital ships through the same method, allowing them to destroy its key components and ultimately destroy it. The game is geared towards online multiplayer but has support for offline single-player with bots.

Since 2019 the average monthly playerbase of Angels Fall First fell below that which was sustainable for multiplayer gameplay, bottoming out to an average of 1.4 players per month as of March, 2022. The average server meanwhile has a maximum of 64 player slots, of which are filled with bots to compensate for the lack of players.

Development
Angels Fall First has been in development from as early as 2007, planned for submission to the Make Something Unreal Contest hosted by Epic Games. The original mod consistently won prizes in the pre-final phases, eventually winning third place in the Grand Finals.

As of 2009, development of the Unreal Tournament 3 mod had ceased, the team having then changed engines to the Unreal Development Kit, which would make the game itself standalone. A demo version of the mod ported into the UDK engine was released in 2009. The game became available on Steam Early Access on October 10th 2015 and has been receiving continual updates.

References

External links
 AFF: Planetstorm ModDB page
 Steam store page

2009 video games
Multiplayer online games
Windows games
Windows-only games
Multiplayer and single-player video games
Unreal Engine games
Unreal (video game series) mods
Early access video games
Video games developed in the United Kingdom